Adampalli  is a village in the southern state of Karnataka, India. It is located in the Bangarapet taluk of Kolar district in Karnataka. It is inhabited by Telugu speaking community.

See also
 Kolar
 Districts of Karnataka

References

External links
 http://Kolar.nic.in/

Villages in Kolar district